Samuel Richard Harris (born 30 January 1980) is a former New Zealand-born, Australian professional rugby footballer and previously head coach of the Austin Gilgronis of Major League Rugby (MLR).
He is of New Zealand Maori descent.

He played representative rugby league for City NSW and in the National Rugby League for the Manly-Warringah Sea Eagles and Wests Tigers clubs. His usual position was in the second row. Harris also played rugby union for the NSW Waratahs and Western Force in the Super 14 competition and the Warringah Rats and Manly Marlins in the Shute Shield and for the Central Coast Rays in the ARC competition.

Harris' only representative appearance in rugby league came in 2004 when he played for City in the annual City v. Country match. His first match for the Wests Tigers was their loss to the Bradford Bulls in the 2006 World Club Challenge.

He returned to rugby union in 2007 when he signed on with the Waratahs franchise for the 2007 Super 14 competition playing at centre. At the conclusion of the 2008 season Harris went to Japan to play for Honda Heat for a season before returning to Australia and playing for the Western Force in the 2010. At the conclusion of the 2010 season he retired from playing.

Coaching
Harris moved into coaching and started his coaching career with the Warringah Rats in 2011. After 2 seasons as head coach with the Rats he returned to Japan and the Honda Heat to be an assistant coach for 4 seasons before moving onto Ricoh Black Rams to be an assistant coach for 3 seasons. At the conclusion of the 2020 season he moved to Austin Gilgronis to be their head coach for 2 seasons.

Career highlights 

Junior Club: Avalon Bulldogs
First Grade Debut: Round 10, Manly v Parramatta at Brookvale Oval, 18 May 2003
First Grade Record:  64 appearances scoring 10 tries & 3 goals

References

1980 births
Living people
New Zealand rugby union players
New Zealand rugby league players
Manly Warringah Sea Eagles players
Wests Tigers players
New South Wales Waratahs players
New South Wales City Origin rugby league team players
Rugby union players from Auckland
Rugby league second-rows